The Island Years is a double CD compilation of John Cale's work during 1974 and 1975.  The collection, released in 1996, is composed of the three previously released Cale albums issued by Island Records:  Fear, Slow Dazzle and Helen of Troy.  The album also includes some extra tracks, b-sides, and individual tracks from other albums but the Slow Dazzles last and experimental track "The Jeweller" was shortened to 4:11 (The same length as on the original LP of Slow Dazzle. On the CD version of the album, the track's duration is 5:07). In 2007 The Island Years was reissued as a budget release, Gold'', with the same track listing but reduced packaging.

Track listing
CD 1Fear (1974) & outtake "Fear Is a Man's Best Friend"  – 3:52
 "Buffalo Ballet"  – 3:28
 "Barracuda"  – 3:46
 "Emily"  – 4:21
 "Ship of Fools"  – 4:36
 "Gun"  – 8:04
 "The Man Who Couldn't Afford to Orgy"  – 4:33
 "You Know More Than I Know"  – 3:34
 "Momamma Scuba"  – 4:23
 "Sylvia Said"  – 4:07 (single B-side, remixed; leaving the original single 45 a rarity)Slow Dazzle (1975) & outtakes'''
 "All I Want Is You"  – 2:55 (outtake)
 "Bamboo Floor"  – 3:24 (outtake)
 "Mr. Wilson"  – 3:15
 "Taking It All Away"  – 2:56
 "Dirty-Ass Rock 'N' Roll"  – 4:41
 "Darling I Need You"  – 3:35
 "Rollaroll"  – 3:57
CD2
 "Heartbreak Hotel"  – 3:10
 "Ski Patrol"  – 2:05
 "I'm Not the Loving Kind"  – 3:07
 "Guts"  – 3:26
 "The Jeweller"  – 4:11
'''Helen of Troy (1975) & outtakes
 "My Maria"  – 3:48
 "Helen of Troy"  – 4:18
 "China Sea"  – 2:30
 "Engine"  – 2:45
 "Save Us"  – 2:20
 "Cable Hogue"  – 3:30
 "(I Keep A) Close Watch"  – 3:27
 "Pablo Picasso"  – 3:20
 "Leaving It Up To You"  – 4:33
 "Baby, What You Want Me to Do?"  – 4:48
 "Sudden Death"  – 4:36
 "You & Me"  – 2:50 (outtake)
 "Coral Moon"  – 2:14 (originally replaced "Leaving It Up To You")
 "Mary Lou"  – 2:46 (outtake that originally appeared on the 1977 Guts compilation)

References

1996 compilation albums
John Cale compilation albums
Island Records compilation albums